The Darley Football Netball Club, nicknamed the Devils, is an Australian rules football and netball club based in the Victorian town of Bacchus Marsh. The football squad competes in the Ballarat Football League.

In 2017 Darley defeated Bacchus Marsh convincingly in both the first and seconds Grand Finals.

History
Darley Football Club was formed in 1919 when it was known as the Magpies, playing in the Melton and Bacchus Marsh District Football League where the club was successful winning nine premierships between 1934 and 1957. The club then progressed into the newly formed Bacchus Marsh Football League, and was successful with premierships in 1959 and a golden era of four consecutive premierships from 1969–1972.

Darley moved into the Central Highlands Football League and again found success in 1984 before moving into the Riddell District Football League in 1986. Ruckman and local club legend Peter Keep won four consecutive league best and fairest awards while in the CHFL. The committee of management at the time saw this as a positive move of the club wanting to test itself and its players at a higher standard.
 
Upon entering the Riddell League, Darley was forced to change its club emblem from the Magpies as another club in the league (Wallan Football Club) was already known by the same name. Consequently, the club voted to change its emblem to that of a Tasmanian devil which remains to this day. During the time spent in the Riddell League, the club participated in finals football in every year except 1996, and then only missing out by percentage. Success was again attained with premierships in both 1989 and 1995, with Mick Hewat successful in winning the Bowen Medal as the league best and fairest in 1988, and Lex Miller winning the same award in 1989.
 
With the depth of football standard in the RDFL on the decline, together with considerable opposition from former second division clubs on the formation of one division, the club voted to make the move to the highly rated Ballarat Football League with Sunbury, Melton and Melton South clubs for the commencement of the 1997 playing season.
 
Darley centreman, Shayne Ward, won the BFL's Henderson Medal for league best and fairest in 1999. The club has also produced many fine players who have gone to play at higher levels. These include Collingwood Brownlow Medallist Marcus Whelan, Wayne Closter a 200-game player with Geelong Football Club, and more recently Heath Scotland who played for both Collingwood Football Club (53 games) and Carlton Football Club (215 games) before retiring in 2014.

The annual general meeting held on 24 November 2009 was an historic occasion. A motion was passed that the club name be changed to the Darley Football Netball Club Inc.

Several senior list players have also had experience at AFL reserves and VFA/VFL senior level.

Premierships
Ballarat Football League
2015, 2017
Riddell District Football League
1989, 1995
Central Highlands Football League
1983, 1984
Bacchus Marsh Football League
1959, 1969, 1970, 1971, 1972
Melton & Bacchus Marsh Football League
1923, 1926, 1934, 1938, 1939, 1947, 1949, 1950, 1952, 1955, 1957

VFL/AFL players
Marcus Whelan - 
Billy Libbis -  and 
Heath Scotland -  and 
Wayne Closter - 
Marshall Younger - South Melbourne
Jack Skinner - Carlton
Zak Butters - Port Adelaide
Brett Bewley - Fremantle

Bibliography
History of Football in the Ballarat District by John Stoward -

References

External links
Official website

Ballarat Football League clubs
Bacchus Marsh
Sports clubs established in 1919
Australian rules football clubs established in 1919
1919 establishments in Australia
Netball teams in Victoria (Australia)
Australian rules football clubs in Victoria (Australia)